Ski School 2 is a 1994 comedy film directed by David Mitchell and starring Dean Cameron. Its plot concerns a fictional ski school. The first film in the series, Ski School, also starred Cameron and was written by Mitchell.

Plot

When Dave Marshak (Cameron) learns his ex-girlfriend is getting married, he returns to ski school to stop it.

Cast
 Dean Cameron as Dave Marshak
 Heather Campbell as Beth Roberts
 Will Sasso as Tomcat Collins
 Bil Dwyer as Toddorbert
 Doug Copithorne as Alex
 Wendy Hamilton as Lola Schnitzelbank
 Brent Sheppard as Steve Longwood

Production
Ski School 2 was credited with being written by Jay Naples, but that name is speculated to be just a pseudonym for director David Mitchell, who wrote the first Ski School film. Indeed the name Jay Naples does not have any other writing or film credits listed on IMDB.

Filming took place in Vancouver, British Columbia, and on location at Whistler, British Columbia. It was also notable for being the film debut of both Bil Dwyer and Will Sasso. One viewer noted of Sasso, he was "clearly given no direction in some scenes, so you can see him in the background, pulling an insane series of faces while talking to no one."

Reflecting on why he agreed to star in the Ski School series, Dean Cameron recalled: "I wish the movies were more high profile. They offered it to me – and the script had some stuff in it that was subversive for the time. And I said to the producer and the writer, 'This movie is so stupid, we will have a great time making it.' We had a very good time doing that movie."

Stuart Fratkin, who co-starred as Fitz Fitzgerald in the first Ski School, was not asked reprise his role in the sequel because: "they couldn’t afford both Dean and me."

Skiing stunt work was done by Shane Szocs, who in 2006 was named to Powder magazine's list of 48 Skiers Who Shaped Our Sport.

Release
The film was released direct-to-video on February 21, 1994. A DVD was released by Screen Media on December 28, 2004 in pan and scan format.

It's Always Sunny in Philadelphia paid homage to the Ski School series in season 11, episode 3, having Dean Cameron guest star as a burnt-out "party dude" living on the ski slopes.

Reception
The original Ski School has become a cult classic, but the sequel never achieved the same status. One reviewer complains that the antagonist in the sequel falls far short of the original; "That guy was this asshole who did everything perfect and made everyone want to hate him. This one's an anal-retentive moron who looks slightly better than, but is essentially the same person as, Jeremy Piven in Old School." Canuxploitation, noting the lead character's receding hairline, lamented, "the characters in this movie are just too old for this. Acting wacky and drinking copiously is excusable for the young 'uns in this genre...but these characters are like unemployed misfits in their late 20s, and the actors themselves are probably in their early 30s. Even the people in Police Academy had jobs!" Chris Hartley sums it up as, "The only real reason it exists, I assume, is because the original was a minor hit on home video and this is merely a retread that's only worth it for fans of the first."

References

External links
 
 
 

1994 films
1990s English-language films
1990s sex comedy films
Canadian skiing films
Teen sex comedy films
Canadian sex comedy films
English-language Canadian films
Films shot in Vancouver
1994 comedy films
Canadian sports comedy films
1990s Canadian films